iZombie (stylized as iZOMBiE) is an American supernatural procedural crime drama television series developed by Rob Thomas and Diane Ruggiero-Wright for The CW. It is a loose adaptation of the comic book series of the same name created by Chris Roberson and Michael Allred, and published by DC Comics under their Vertigo imprint. The series premiered on March 17, 2015, and ran for five seasons, ending on August 1, 2019. It follows the adventures of a doctor-turned-zombie named Olivia "Liv" Moore (Rose McIver), a Seattle Police medical examiner who helps solve murders after eating the victims' brains and temporarily absorbing their memories and personalities.

Premise and synopsis
Seattle medical resident Olivia "Liv" Moore is turned into a zombie while attending a boat party. She abandons her career and breaks up with her fiancé, much to the disappointment and puzzlement of her family. She discovers that if she does not periodically satisfy her new appetite for brains, she will turn into a stereotypically primitive and homicidal zombie. Instead of feeding by killing innocent people, Liv decides to take a job at the King County morgue and eat the brains of the corpses she autopsies. Her secret is guessed by her boss, Dr. Ravi Chakrabarti. Ravi soon becomes Liv's friend and confidant, and as a scientist, he is intrigued by her condition.

Whenever Liv eats a dead person's brain, she temporarily absorbs some of their personality traits and skills, and she experiences flashbacks of that person's life. In the case of murder victims, the flashbacks offer clues about the killer. Liv uses this new ability to help Police Detective Clive Babineaux solve crimes. Though she initially passes herself off as a psychic, Clive eventually learns the truth about her and zombies. Meanwhile, Ravi works to develop a cure for Liv's affliction, in the hope that one day she will be able to return to her former life.

Over the course of the first few seasons, the number of zombies in Seattle gradually increases, while various factions try to cover up their existence, fight them, exploit them, or protect them. At the end of the third season, a zombie-run private military company infects thousands of people in Seattle with the zombie virus and imposes martial law on the city to create a safe haven for zombies. The final two seasons deal with the struggles and conflicts of living under these conditions; Liv becomes the leader of a human smuggling operation bringing people who want to become zombies into Seattle.

Cast and characters

 Rose McIver as Olivia "Liv" Moore: A former medical resident who became a zombie when she attended a boat party that was attacked by people who had just taken a new designer drug called "Utopium" while also consuming the Max Rager energy drink. She works as a coroner's assistant for the King County Medical Examiner's Office to have access to the human brains she must frequently consume to maintain her humanity and suppress her hunger. She experiences flashes of memories from the brains she eats, and temporarily takes on random quirks from her subjects and has demonstrated the ability to take a bullet to the chest with little damage. Through her visions, Liv uses her powers to bring justice to the victims and help Seattle Police find and apprehend murderers. In season four she assumes the alias "Renegade", eventually becoming a public figure as she seeks to aid other zombies by smuggling them in and out of the city.
 Malcolm Goodwin as Clive Babineaux: A Seattle PD detective, newly transferred from vice to homicide when the series starts, who gets Liv's help to solve crimes. Liv and Ravi initially claim that she is "psychic-ish" to account for her knowledge of victims, but he eventually learns the truth about her in the second season. With her help, Clive has solved many cases in an incredibly efficient and accurate fashion, hoping one day to be promoted to captain. He is in a relationship with former federal agent-turned cop Dale Bozzio.
 Rahul Kohli as Ravi Chakrabarti: A medical examiner, Liv's friend, and Major's eventual roommate. He knows Liv's secret and assists her whenever he can to protect as well as study her, expressing an interest in finding a cure for her condition. He used to work for the Centers for Disease Control and Prevention but was fired for his obsession with preparing for an attack with biological weapons. In season 4, he becomes a half zombie while experimenting on himself to develop a zombie vaccine.
 Robert Buckley as Major Lillywhite: Liv's ex-fiancé, with whom she ended the relationship to prevent him from becoming "infected" by her condition. He worked as a social worker at the local teen center, Helton Shelter, in the first season. In the second season he was blackmailed into working for Max Rager, and he works for Fillmore-Graves in the third and fourth seasons. In the fourth season finale, he becomes the commander of the organization after the death of his predecessor, Chase Graves.
 David Anders as Blaine "DeBeers" McDonough: A drug dealer-turned brain-dealing zombie who dealt a tainted version of the experimental drug, Utopium, which helped cause the zombie outbreak. Despite being a career criminal and often serving as an antagonist, he is offered a pardon in the fourth season finale and the chance to be a hero by smuggling and supplying brains after the government cuts off shipments. This leads to him becoming a celebrity in the fifth season, though he still resorts to criminal activity to ensure the brain supply, and to that end, his status. Eventually he is exposed as part of a plot by Stacey Boss, and after losing everything becomes more evil than ever in an attempt to regain his lifestyle. Show co-creator Diane Ruggiero-Wright stated prior to the series finale that there were once plans to redeem the character, who acted as the series’ wild card, but they ultimately fell through.
 Aly Michalka as Peyton Charles: Liv's best friend and roommate, who expresses concern about Liv's declining interest in life after the boat party. She also works as an assistant district attorney for the King County Prosecuting Attorney's Office, before becoming the Mayor's Chief of Staff at the end of the third season. Following the Mayor's death, she becomes the acting Mayor with the goal of improving relations between Seattle's zombies and humans. Alexandra Krosney played the part of Peyton Charles in the original unaired pilot. (season 3–5; recurring seasons 1–2)
 Robert Knepper as Angus McDonough: Blaine's estranged and abusive father whom he turned into a zombie, and who tried to force Blaine to work for him prior to becoming one of Major's Chaos Killer victims. When the character returns as a regular in the fourth season, he becomes a religious cult leader known as "Brother Love", preaching pro-zombie/anti-human sentiment. Angus is ultimately executed by the United States military after trying to escape the city while leading a mass breakout of his followers. Though he attempted to mend his relationship with his son, it deteriorates immediately prior to his death upon discovering Blaine manipulated and used his cult for his own ends. (season 4; recurring seasons 2–3)
 Bryce Hodgson as Donald "Don E." Eberhard: An associate of Blaine who becomes his henchman, and later business partner. Hodgson also played the character's twin brother Scott E., a mental patient who believes in zombies, in two episodes of the first season and a flashback in the final season. (season 5; recurring seasons 2–4)

Episodes

iZombie was officially picked up on May 8, 2014, and premiered on March 17, 2015. On May 6, 2015, The CW renewed the series for a second season. On November 23, 2015, The CW ordered six additional episodes for the second season, bringing the episode count to a total of 19 episodes. iZombie was renewed for a third season on March 11, 2016. iZombie was renewed for a fourth season on May 10, 2017, which premiered on February 26, 2018. iZombie was renewed for a fifth and final season in May 2018, which premiered on May 2, 2019.

Production

Development
Rob Thomas was approached by Warner Brothers to develop the series while he was editing the film version of Veronica Mars. At first he refused, but Warner Brothers was insistent, and he eventually took the job. Prior to iZombie, Thomas was attempting to pitch his own zombie television series; when AMC picked up The Walking Dead, it was "so similar to what we were doing, it just killed that project", according to Thomas.

The opening credits for the series are drawn by Michael Allred, the main artist and co-creator of the original comic book. The series' theme tune is "Stop, I'm Already Dead" by Deadboy & the Elephantmen.

On October 5, 2015, The CW ordered five additional scripts for the second season; however, on November 23, 2015, the network ordered six additional episodes into production, bringing the season order to 19 episodes.

Casting
Alexandra Krosney originally played the part of Peyton Charles. After the series was ordered, she was replaced by Aly Michalka, and the role was changed from regular cast to recurring. Michalka was later promoted to series regular for the series' third season. Nora Dunn was initially attached to play Liv's mother; however, it was changed when it was realized that her character was going to play a smaller role than initially envisioned. She was replaced by Molly Hagan. Rob Thomas has stated that this move was a financial decision.

On May 22, 2016, it was announced that Aly Michalka had been promoted to series regular for the third season. On July 21, 2017, it was announced that Robert Knepper had been promoted to series regular for the fourth season. On September 27, 2018, it was announced that Bryce Hodgson had been promoted to series regular for the fifth and final season.

David Anders stated following Knepper's departure that while he had suggested Rutger Hauer to play his character's father, he believed Knepper did well in the role.

Allegations against Knepper
Late in 2017, in the wake of sexual assault allegations against Robert Knepper, The CW conducted an internal inquiry. Finding no evidence of misconduct transpiring on the set, it was announced he would be remaining on the series. McIver and Kohli released statements following the decision, with McIver stating she supported and admired the bravery of women coming forward in general; Kohli said he did not feel comfortable giving his full thoughts at the time.

Knepper personally announced his promotion in a video released at Comic Con; but did not partake in promotional interviews for his role following the allegations, nor did he attend the fourth-season wrap party.

On January 12, 2018, it was announced that the studio had conducted a second investigation. CW president Mark Pedowitz stated, "Again, the investigation related to the set and his behavior on the set. They found no wrongdoing on the set." Pedowitz elaborated that Knepper had signed on for a single season and that his exit from the series had already been planned.

Reception

Critical response

The first season received generally positive reviews. Review aggregation website Rotten Tomatoes gave the series a 92% approval rating, with an average rating of 7.65/10, based on 52 reviews. The site's critical consensus states: "An amusing variation on the zombie trend, iZombie is refreshingly different, if perhaps too youth-oriented to resonate with adult audiences." Metacritic, which uses a weighted average, assigned a score of 74 out of 100, based on reviews from 38 critics, indicating "generally favorable reviews".

Amy Ratcliffe of IGN rated the pilot episode 8.4/10, praising the series' "casual take on zombies" and Rose McIver's performance as Liv. LaToya Ferguson of The Onions The A.V. Club graded the series an A- and stated the series is better for diverging from its comic book origins. She praised the series for having the same quick-witted banter as Veronica Mars and observed it measures up well against Pushing Daisies, noting: "Television can only be better for having the voices of Thomas and Ruggiero-Wright back on a weekly basis". Inkoo Kang of the Dallas Observer called the series, "dazzlingly, tirelessly witty" with an "acute attention to human relationships", and praised it as "the summer's most underrated series".

The second season was also met with positive reviews. It holds a 100% approval rating on Rotten Tomatoes, based on 14 reviews with an average score of 8.39/10. The website's consensus states: "iZombie smoothly shifts gears in its second season, moving between comedy and dramatic procedural while skillfully satirizing modern society along the way."

The third season received further praise with a score of 100% on Rotten Tomatoes, based on 10 reviews with an average rating of 8.56/10. The website's consensus reads, "Broodier and brainier, iZombies third season may be its best yet".

The fourth season has been met with similar praise. It earned a score of 92% on Rotten Tomatoes, based on 12 reviews, with an average rating of 8.13/10. The website's consensus reads, "iZombies fourth season boldly flips the board on the series narrative, injecting fresh blood into its amiable corpse and promising that it won't go stiff anytime soon".

On Rotten Tomatoes season 5 has an approval rating of 71% based on reviews from 7 critics.

The series finale was met with notable negative response, however. In March 2022, nearly three years after its airing, Paste reflected that both the finale and final season as a whole seemed to have suffered due to Rob Thomas' preoccupation with the concurrent revival of Veronica Mars, and stated "The finale of iZombie was one of the worst TV viewing experiences I have ever had. As the minutes unfolded I became filled with horror watching everything fall apart. The characters I had loved for five seasons turned into strangers. And when the credits finally rolled, I found myself questioning all the love I had put into it." The same month, Rahul Kohli admitted dissatisfaction with the finale, saying that he felt that it "sucked" and was "super disappointing".

Ratings

Accolades
The fourth season received the ReFrame Stamp, which is awarded by the gender equity coalition ReFrame as a "mark of distinction" for film and television projects that are proven to have gender-balanced hiring, with stamps being awarded to projects that hire female-identifying people, especially those of color, in four out of eight critical areas of their production.

Home media
The first three seasons of the show have been released on DVD and Blu-ray by Warner Home Entertainment and the Warner Archive Collection respectively. The fourth season did not receive a release due to rights issues, according to Warner Archive. The fourth season cannot be purchased on digital stores, but is available for streaming on Netflix. The fifth season was not released either, supposedly due to the fourth season not being released. However, unlike the fourth season, the fifth season is available for purchase on digital stores.

Notes

References

External links

 
 

2015 American television series debuts
2019 American television series endings
2010s American comedy-drama television series
2010s American crime drama television series
2010s American medical television series
2010s American mystery television series
2010s American police procedural television series
American action television series
American crime comedy television series
English-language television shows
Fictional portrayals of the Seattle Police Department
Human-zombie romance in fiction
Television series by Warner Bros. Television Studios
Television shows based on DC Comics
Television shows filmed in Vancouver
Television shows set in Seattle
The CW original programming
Zombies in television